The Church of Our Lady of Lourdes (Tamil: தூய லூர்து அன்னை ஆலயம்) is a Catholic church in Singapore. It is located at Ophir Road in the Rochor Planning Area, within the Central Area in Singapore's central business district.

History
The Church of Our Lady of Lourdes was blessed and officially opened in 1888. This is the first Tamil Catholic church in Singapore. The building site was obtained in 1885 and the cornerstone laid on 1 August 1886 by Bishop Gasnier, D.D. and Sir Frederick A. Weld, G. C M. G in an official ceremony that was witnessed by a number of religious and laity. It bears a resemblance to the Sanctuary of Our Lady of Lourdes, in France. Within the Church building itself is a grotto with life-sized statues depicting the appearance of Our Lady appearing to Saint Bernadette.

Masses are held in English, Tamil and Sinhalese.

The Church of Our Lady of Lourdes was gazetted as a national monument on 14 January 2005. As a national monument, it was given funding from the National Monuments Fund, administrated by the National Heritage Board, in 2016 for renovation works.

Architecture
In 2009, the church building underwent restoration works to resemble the original church at a budget of S$1.75 million. It was completed in October 2010.

References

Norman Edwards, Peter Keys (1988), Singapore – A Guide to Buildings, Streets, Places, Times Books International, 
Wan Meng Hao (2005), Know Our Monuments , Preservation of Monuments Board

External links

Singapore Catholic Church Directory
Parish of Our Lady of Lourdes, Singapore
 Infopedia

Landmarks in Singapore
National monuments of Singapore
Indian diaspora in Singapore
Roman Catholic churches completed in 1889
19th-century Roman Catholic church buildings in Singapore
Rochor